USA-165 or XSS-11 (Experimental Satellite System-11) is a small, washing-machine-sized, low-cost spacecraft developed by the U.S. Air Force Research Laboratory's Space Vehicles Directorate to test technology for proximity operations. In particular, the satellite was designed to demonstrate "autonomous rendezvous and proximity maneuvers." In other words, it would approach, investigate, and photograph other spacecraft in Earth orbit. It would help test the feasibility of in-space inspection and repair. The spacecraft was also designed to test systems that would allow the spacecraft to maneuver autonomously.

USA-165 was built by Lockheed Martin and weighed 125 kg with an excess of 600 m/s delta-v.  USA-165 was launched into Low Earth Orbit on April 11, 2005, on a Minotaur rocket and remained in its primary orbit for over eighteen months, but then in December 2006 it was maneuvered into a disposal orbit and lost to satellite spotters. USA-165 was later rediscovered by amateur satellite watcher Kevin Fetter. The satellite re-entered the atmosphere on November 11, 2013.

The NASA GRAIL spacecraft design was based on XSS-11 design.

See also 

 MiTEx

References

External links
Space.com News
XSS-11 micro satellite
LOST AND FOUND: XSS-11 SPYSAT

Spacecraft launched in 2005
Spacecraft launched by Minotaur rockets
USA satellites
Spacecraft which reentered in 2013